Kenneth "Kenny" Adams (born September 25, 1940) is an American professional boxing trainer and former Olympic amateur boxer. Adams is a highly respected boxing trainer, having been inducted into the Missouri Sports Hall of Fame in 2010. Adams is a pioneer in boxing, having been the first American trainer to implement strength training. He is also the first African-American selected as head coach of the American national boxing team. Adams brings such a strict disciplinarian training style that the eight-time, five-division World champion Floyd Mayweather Jr. refused to work with him. In 1999, the multiple-time World champion Wladimir Klitschko asked Adams to assist him in properly turning over his fist on the left hook for power. In 2005, eight-division World champion Manny Pacquiao requested to train with Adams, but Adams declined to aid to his ill wife at the time.

He is the former boxing coach of twenty-six professional World champions, thirty four Olympians and a total of fifty-six boxers who became World Champion. This list includes Edwin Valero, Vince Phillips, Diego Corrales, Freddie Norwood, Charles Murray, Kennedy McKinney, Frankie Liles, Michael Nunn, Johnny Tapia, Ruslan Chagaev, Samuel Peter, Cory Spinks, and Michael Bentt. Adams also trained notable boxers Evander Holyfield, Pernell Whitaker, Roy Jones Jr., and Riddick Bowe in the Summer Olympic Games with Team USA.

Adams is considered a legend among boxing culture, once going 22 straight World championship bouts without a loss.

Adams' last most promising boxer was lightweight contender Sharif Bogere. Adams has since retired from the sport due to health issues.

Boxing career
Adams grew up with 5 brothers and 4 sisters. He first became interested in boxing when he was 5 or 6, and he admits to always fighting as a little kid. Adams is on record saying that he had a reputation although he was small in stature, he packed quick hands and was brave. He also learned how to curse at a very young age from being around people in the pub where he grew up. Once as a kid in gym class, Adams knocked an older boy out that outweighed him by over one-hundred pounds.

Adams never had a trainer, having his first amateur fight at the age of 12 at a weight of 95 pounds.  He had a successful amateur career, winning all Army and Service championships, as well as the East Coast & Florida AU’s titles fighting at Flyweight and Bantamweight. He was nicknamed “Little Sugar” as his good friend Ray Owens, who was a 1964 Olympic alternate, was known as “Big Sugar” both in homage to the great Sugar Ray Robinson.

By 17 years old he was in the army and continued to box, but never elected to turn professional. When was 26 years old, he was offered a pro contract. He considered it, but came to the conclusion that he only boxed for the love of the sport – never for the money. Adams fought in over 200 bouts as an amateur.

Adams considers Carlton Brooks, Pat Nappi, Barron Walker, Bernie Callahan and Thomas Boudion as his boxing teachers.

Military service
Adams would go on to complete 30 years of service during which he served in Vietnam and was in the 101 Airborne Division, where as part of a 5-man team he went behind enemy lines.

While serving, Adams was in charge of constructing and training the United States Army team, who had been losing to Germany handily. Adams made a strong emphasis in that the fighters were in shape and were sound technically. After much success against the Germans, Adams grew confident in his abilities to coach and was invited to bring a team to the German Olympic training camp. There and then, Adams would become the first American ever to implement strength training into boxing. Adams also utilized  plyometrics to boost the fighters cardio and wind.

Boxing trainer
After completing his service time, Adams would assist the 1984 American Olympic team in achieving 9 gold medals, one silver and one bronze. His students would include future World champions in Evander Holyfield, Meldrick Taylor, Pernell Whitaker, Mark Breland, Frank Tate, Henry Tillman, and Virgil Hill.

Four years later, he moved up as head trainer for the 1988 American Olympic team. Adams was suspended for six months for assaulting USA/ABF controller J. Kersten Dahl in an incident at the federation's headquarters in Colorado Springs, Colorado. The two engaged in a shouting match that ended with Adams grabbing him by the throat. Adams would be reinstated after he appealed the decision to the federation's board of directors.

He was again very successful winning 3 gold medals, 3 silver, and 2 bronze. His students would include even more future world champions in Roy Jones Jr., Riddick Bowe, Michael Carbajal, Kennedy McKinney, Kenneth Gould, Anthony Hembrick, Andrew Maynard, and Ray Mercer. Many believe that Roy Jones Jr. was robbed of the gold medal in the final against Park Si-hun of South Korea. Adams similarly believes that Michael Carbajal also suffered the same fate. To add, Adams believed that the Riddick Bowe fight was stopped prematurely against Lennox Lewis of Canada.

At the professional level, his first world champion was Rene Jacquot of France, who stunned Donald Curry in 1989 in what was voted "Upset of the Year" by The Ring magazine. His first American champion was Eddie Cook, who stopped Israel Contreras in early 1992.

At the professional level, Adams has also trained world champions in William Abelyan, Michael Bentt, Al Cole, Diego Corrales, B.J. Flores, Michael Nunn, Johnny Tapia, Samuel Peter, Ruslan Chagaev, Cory Spinks, Frankie Liles, Kennedy McKinney, Ray Mercer, Charles Murray, Freddie Norwood, Vince Phillips, and James Kirkland (briefly after his second prison stint).

Adams currently trains lightweight contender Sharif Bogere, middleweight Bastie Samir, and Cuban amateur standout lightweight Raul Cespedes out of the Long Life Fighter Gym in Las Vegas, Nevada.

Style and philosophy
Adams marvels at studying and watching his opponents' films and tapes. He is known for successfully predicting in what round and with what combination his fighter will win. He is also known for never losing a re-match with any opponent, due to his great ability to make adjustments after the first fight. One of Adams' many sayings is "nobody beats me twice!".

Adams brings an extremely strict disciplinarian style to the gym with him. He demands a strong work ethic and he lives with the mentality that he is always the boss - it's his way or the highway. Adams exclaimed that “they asked me to work with Floyd Mayweather Jr. back in the late 90s and early 2000s, so I headed over to the gym and was working out with another guy out front. When he showed up, he had one of his guys come and tell me he was ready for me out back. I told his guy that 'I'm the boss' and to come out front. In the end, we went our own separate ways.”

Adams worked with the undisciplined World champion Edwin Valero up until his death in 2010. Adams stated that “Valero always used to try to overrule people, but I was always up with him. The way I catch mitts I think drew him to me. I'd bust a cat upside the head if his defense wasn’t working. So when he made mistakes, I’d bust him by the side of his head. I think he respected that because most people didn’t stand up to him".

Adams is a strong believer in the "hit and don't get hit" style of boxing. He has mastered the defensive art of "stepping to the side, using angles and moving your head". He believes that his fighters will have longer careers if they can master his defensive techniques, while also learning his gritty, offensive attacks.

Health concerns
In late November 2010, Adams (aged 69) was admitted to a hospital in Las Vegas when his bladder and prostate swelled up, leaving him close to kidney failure. He recovered very quickly, in time to be ringside to see his fighter Sharif Bogere win on the undercard of Khan-Miadana in mid December. Adams was back on the mitts just two days later.

Honors
 Inducted into the Missouri Sports Hall of Fame in 2010.
 Two-time "Coach of the Year"
 Ring Magazine "Upset of the Year" (Rene Jacquot) in 1992.
 Won 3 gold medals, 3 silver & 2 bronze in the 1988 Summer Olympics (USA).
 Won 9 gold medals, one silver and one bronze in the 1984 Summer Olympics (USA).
 Won every Army and Service championship fighting at flyweight (amateur).
 Won East Coast & Florida AU’s titles fighting at bantamweight (amateur).
Inducted into the Nevada Boxing Hall of Fame in July 2016.

Notable boxers trained

Key

Notable mixed martial artists trained

Key

References

External links
 Fight-Hype interview with Kenny Adams
 
 Official 

Sportspeople from Springfield, Missouri
Flyweight boxers
Bantamweight boxers
1940 births
Living people
American boxing trainers
American male boxers